ST6 may refer to:

 ST6 and ST7, 8-bit microcontroller product lines from STMicroelectronics
 ST6, a postcode district in the Stoke-on-Trent postcode area
 ST6, a variant of the Pratt & Whitney Canada PT6 turboprop aircraft engine
 ST6, the Finance and Investment Specialist Technical B examination of the Institute of Actuaries
 ST6, the last of the KX series of telephone boxes in the United Kingdom

See also
 Star Trek VI: The Undiscovered Country, a 1991 American science fiction film